Begonia annulata, the ringed begonia, is a species of flowering plant in the genus Begonia native to the eastern Himalaya, Bangladesh, Assam in India, Myanmar, and Vietnam. It has gained the Royal Horticultural Society's Award of Garden Merit.

References

annulata
Plants described in 1857